Merriweather Post Pavilion is an outdoor concert venue located within Symphony Woods, a  lot of preserved land in the heart of the planned community of Columbia, Maryland. In 2010, Merriweather was named the second best amphitheater in the United States by Billboard magazine. The venue was also ranked as the fourth best amphitheater in the United States by Rolling Stone in 2013. It was again ranked by Consequence of Sound at number 29 of all music venues in the nation out of 100 in 2016.

History

20th century
Merriweather Post Pavilion was commissioned by the Rouse Company for its Howard County development project Columbia. The first design was rejected and the theatre was redesigned by award-winning architect Frank Gehry and N. David O'Malley with the firm of Gehry, Walsh and O'Malley. It opened in 1967 on the former grounds of the Oakland Manor slave plantation. It is named for the American Post Foods heiress Marjorie Merriweather Post to honor her for her years of sustained financial support for the National Symphony. The theatre was originally intended to be a summer home for the National Symphony Orchestra. It later became a venue for popular music concerts, including performances by Jimi Hendrix, Janis Joplin, The Doors, Led Zeppelin, The Grateful Dead, and The Who.

A grand opening gala was held on July 14, 1967, and Vice President Hubert Humphrey attended a presentation of "Columbia: Broadsides for Orchestra" in a driving rainstorm that flooded the orchestra to its knees. The Orchestra went bankrupt the next year. In the 1968 season, controversial presidential candidate George Wallace held a 7,500-person rally on June 27, 1968, followed shortly after by candidate Eugene McCarthy.

On May 25, 1969, The Who and Led Zeppelin shared a stage for the first and only time, playing to a crowd of 20,000. Led Zeppelin performed "Whole Lotta Love" live for just the second time ever, and allegedly ran long in their opening slot, resulting in their plug being pulled by The Who's production crew.

Before the start of the 1970 season, loge sections were built (adding 1,800 seats) in order to book a seven-night run of Tom Jones, featuring Gladys Knight & the Pips as the opening act.

In 1970, Columbia's manager Richard Anderson dropped bookings of rock groups after gate crashing and disturbances at a Steppenwolf concert. The Nederlander Organization began managing the venue in 1971. By 1972, the music shifted from Rouse & Merriweather's vision of symphonies to rock performers, and Charles E. Miller proposed bills that would disallow performances of entertainers with a history of violence in venues with a capacity of 3,000 or more. In the summer of 1974, Howard Research and Development manager Micheal Spear banned rock music after more incidents, listing Alice Cooper, Grateful Dead, and Edgar Winter as artists that were unacceptable.

In 1977, Jimmy Buffett performed at Merriweather for the first time. He has since played a total of 42 times, the most by any act.

In 1978, and again in 1980 during his campaign against Ronald Reagan, President Jimmy Carter joined Willie Nelson on stage to sing a duet of "Georgia on My Mind".

SFX bought the entertainment lease in 1999.

21st century
In 2003, development by General Growth Properties threatened to shutter the pavilion, drawing the ire of local Columbia teens, along with former bandmates Ian Kennedy and Justin Carlson, who launched and sustained a grassroots "Save Merriweather" campaign to keep the concert venue open. As part of the fight, Kennedy vowed not to shave his beard until the future of Merriweather was secure.

As "Save Merriweather" began to pick up steam, General Growth Properties offered to sell Merriweather to Howard County on condition that the pavilion be converted into a much smaller, enclosed theater. Shortly thereafter, 9:30 Club owner Seth Hurwitz's I.M.P. was chosen as Merriweather's new promoter amidst the claim by GGP's General Manager that trying to make Merriweather Post Pavilion profitable was like "trying to sell ice cubes in the middle of winter."

In 2005, Howard County held a charrette to discuss redevelopment of the Rouse Planned community beyond its initial 100,000 population design. In 2010, The Downtown Columbia Plan passed, requiring the developer, General Growth Properties (now the Howard Hughes Corporation), to renovate Merriweather before additional development could occur in Columbia. In 2014, County Executive Ken Ulman proposed a bill to relieve Howard Hughes of the renovation expense including a $10 million grant. The final plan which only granted $9.5 million to the developer was announced at a Jack Johnson concert on June 5, 2014, removing a major development restriction.

Virgin Mobile's FreeFest was hosted at Merriweather Post Pavilion for five years, from 2009 to 2013. Each festival was free to attend contingent on attendees completing charitable tasks in their community. VIP tickets were also available to purchase, with proceeds donated to the RE*Generation House homeless youth shelter in Washington, D.C. An estimated 50,000 people attended each year, which included guest appearances by Virgin's CEO, Sir Richard Branson, and such acts as Jack White, LCD Soundystem, Pavement, The Black Keys, Vampire Weekend, M83, TV on the Radio, MGMT, and St. Vincent.

The majority of the wooded and open field land surrounding Symphony Woods and Merriweather served as a park, festival site, event parking, and site of yearly Symphony of Lights Christmas light displays. The Crescent project gets its name from the shape of the work area surrounding the pavilion, as well as Rouse's (Howard Hughes') partnership with Crescent Real Estate Equities on its Woodlands development.

In August 2014, the site made national news when two patrons died and twenty others were hospitalized from drug overdoses after a Mad Decent concert. Venues across the country implemented stricter drug enforcement controls after the incident.

Merriweather Post draws a regional traffic base with 90% of concert attendees traveling from outside of Howard County.

In 2015, the Howard County Planning Board approved a submission by Brian Spencer, a registered lobbyist and project manager by Howard Hughes. The $8.4 million design by Jamie Pett (JP2 architects) includes renovation with new concession stands around the 9:32 club and replacement of the condemned restrooms.

On November 30, 2016, The Howard Hughes Corporation transferred ownership of Merriweather Post Pavilion and Symphony Woods to the Downtown Columbia Arts and Culture Commission, a nonprofit organization helmed by "Save Merriweather" co-founder Ian Kennedy. At the official ceremony, Kennedy shaved the beard he had been growing for 13 years, since the beginning of the campaign in 2003.

2017 marked Merriweather Post Pavilion's 50th season, celebrated in part by I.M.P.'s signing of a new 40-Year lease to continue operating Merriweather through 2057. The celebration continued with the completion of $55 Million of renovations creating 15,000 square feet of dressing rooms and backstage areas including a swimming pool and dining room. The renovations also include the expansion of the stage house in preparation for raising the pavilion's famed roof, the installation of a turntable inset in the stage, and new bathrooms and concessions for patrons, as well as a new VIP rooftop bar.

In honor of its illustrious history, legendary artists from Paul Simon and Sarah McLachlan to Santana returned to the Merriweather stage in 2017, including an Anniversary show featuring Jackson Browne, Willie Nelson, Father John Misty, and Grace Potter.

Early in the morning on January 13, 2018, the roof overhanging the reserved seating at the venue suffered a total failure and collapsed. Management quickly issued a statement indicating that the roof would be replaced, and that the venue would open as scheduled for its 2018 concert season.

In popular culture
Three tracks from Jackson Browne's Running on Empty were recorded at the pavilion on August 27, 1977.
Two tracks from a remastered edition of Men at Work's Cargo were recorded at Merriweather on July 28, 1983.
Animal Collective's critically acclaimed 2009 album Merriweather Post Pavilion is named in tribute to the pavilion, though the band did not actually perform there until 2011.
O.A.R. recorded its seventh live album at the pavilion on September 7, 2019.

Events

See also
List of contemporary amphitheatres
Merriweather Park at Symphony Woods

References

External links

 

Howard County, Maryland landmarks
Buildings and structures in Columbia, Maryland
Amphitheaters in the United States
Music venues in Maryland
Tourist attractions in Howard County, Maryland
1967 establishments in Maryland
Frank Gehry buildings
Music venues completed in 1967